True Believer is an album by the American soul singer Irma Thomas, released in 1992. It was Thomas's fourth album for Rounder Records.

Production
Recorded in New Orleans, the album was produced by Scott Billington and Thomas. The song "I Never Fool Nobody But Me" was cowritten by Thomas and Dr. John. Doc Pomus and Allen Toussaint also contributed songs to True Believer. "Big Talk" was Thomas's attempt at a reggae number.

Critical reception

The Christian Science Monitor thought that Thomas's "honey-smooth voice mixes with her conviction and energy on True Believer to produce a richer and more consistent sound than on any previous effort." The New York Times praised the "smooth funk" and "New Orleans bop." The Toronto Star wrote that the singer "patrols the smooth end of the blues genre, ranging through gospel and r&b too, with a tight band, strong pianist David Torkanowsky and a blasting horn section."

The Washington Post concluded that "when Thomas sings [Dan] Penn's 'Smoke Filled Room' or Pomus's 'I Never Fool Nobody But Me' or Johnny Neel's 'Can't You Hear It in My Tears', the anguish and self-doubt she feels is nearly palpable—a sharp contrast to the songs of love, affirmation and inspiration that dot the album as well and reveal another side of Thomas's compelling vocal personality." The Chicago Tribune determined that Thomas "apparently wants to be taken seriously as a pop diva, and such carefully polished material as 'Trying to Catch a Cab in the Rain' and 'Smoke Filled Room', with their meticulously crafted choruses and slickly cascading arrangements, might do the trick." 

AllMusic called the album "a stellar collection of contemporary soul performed in the classic '50s New Orleans tradition."

Track listing

References

1992 albums
Rounder Records albums